François Clément Lafaury (1834, Saugnac-et-Cambran  −1908, Saugnac-et-Cambran) was a French entomologist who specialised in Lepidoptera. 
He is honoured in the name Choristoneura lafauryana.

His collection is held by Muséum national d'histoire naturelle in Paris.

Francois Clément Lafaury became a Member of the Société entomologique de France in 1858. He was principally 
interested in the Lepidoptera fauna of Landes including the Microlepidoptera.

References
Charles Oberthur Portraits de Lepidopteristes. Premiere Series. in Etudes de Lepidopterologie Comparee fascicule IX. 1914

French lepidopterists
1834 births
1908 deaths